Davis Chirchir (born c. 1960) is a Kenyan politician who was nominated by Former President Uhuru Kenyatta as Cabinet Secretary for Energy and Petroleum on 25 April 2013. He is also a renowned 'IT guru', having started his career in Telkom Kenya, then known as Kenya Posts and Telecommunications Corporation.

Early life and education 
Davis Chirchir was born in Cheptigit, Kericho in 1960. He joined Kericho high school in 1974 to 1978 when he completed. He later did Form 6 in 1979 to 1980. in 1981 he joined university and pursued a course in Physics and Computer Science.

He graduated in 1985 and joined  Kenya Post and Telecommunication Corporation where he worked as a  tele-traffic engineer where he handled management of traffic engineering in telecommunication  for nine months at Multimedia University

Davis Chirchir holds a Master's in Business Administration in International Management from the Royal Holloway School of Management, University of London. He also holds a bachelor's degree in Computer Science and Physics from the University of Nairobi.

Career 
Chirchir  became a senior manager at Telkom Kenya. He also served as the secretary general for the United Republican Party (URP), between 2011 and 2013. Chirchir is credited for Jubilee’s successes in the 2013 and 2017 general elections where Uhuru defeated Raila, emphasizing his credentials as a political operative.

Previously, Davis Chirchir served as the Interim Independent Electoral Commission's  (IIEC) director of information technology. In 2017 he was appointed chief presidential agent by Uhuru Kenyatta.

Having been Ruto's ally for years, Davis also served as Chief of Staff in the office of Deputy President, following the death of his predecessor Ken Osinde, ahead of the 2022 General Elections.

On 27 September 2022, he was appointed by President (Dr.William Samoei Ruto) as the Cabinet Secretary in Charge of Energy and Petroleum, the same ministry he was appointed to by former president Uhuru Kenyatta.

References

1960 births
University of Nairobi alumni
Alumni of Royal Holloway, University of London
Living people
Kenyan politicians